Edwin Joseph Lagger (June 14, 1912 – November 10, 1981) was a Major League Baseball pitcher who played in  with the Philadelphia Athletics. He batted and threw right-handed.

External links

1912 births
1981 deaths
Notre Dame Fighting Irish baseball players
Major League Baseball pitchers
Baseball players from Illinois
Philadelphia Athletics players